The Kenny Clarke/Francy Boland Big Band was a jazz big band co-led by American drummer Kenny Clarke and Belgian pianist François "Francy" Boland. They were one of the most noteworthy jazz big bands formed outside the United States, featuring top European musicians alongside expatriate and touring Americans.

History
American drummer Kenny Clarke and Belgian pianist Francy Boland started the band in Paris in 1960. A sextet became an octet before expanding into a big band that combined European musicians with American jazz expatriates. The debut album, Jazz Is Universal, was released in 1962.

The band collaborated with Stan Getz, Zoot Sims, Derek Watkins, and Phil Woods.

Personnel
 Benny Bailey
 Francy Boland
 Kenny Clare
 Kenny Clarke
 Tony Coe
 Eddie "Lockjaw" Davis
 Jimmy Deuchar
 Carl Drevo
 Muvaffak "Maffy" Falay
 Art Farmer
 Tony Fisher
 Herb Geller
 Dusko Goykovich
 Johnny Griffin
 Tootie Heath
 Derek Humble
 Tony Inzalaco
 Shake Keane
 Rick Keefer
 Erik van Lier
 Albert Mangelsdorff
 Sabu Martinez
 Ron Mathewson
 Milo Pavlovic
 Nat Peck
 Åke Persson
 Ack van Rooyen
 Fats Sadi
 Manfred Schoof
 Ronnie Scott
 Sahib Shihab
 Idrees Sulieman
 Stan Sulzmann
 John Surman
 Jean Warland
 Derek Watkins
 Kenny Wheeler
 Jimmy Woode

Discography

 The Golden 8 (Blue Note, 1961)
 Jazz Is Universal (Atlantic, 1962)
 Handle with Care (Atlantic, 1963)
 Now Hear Our Meanin' (Columbia, 1965)
 Swing, Waltz, Swing (Philips, 1966)
 Out of the Folk Bag (Columbia, 1967)
 Music for the Small Hours (Columbia, 1967)
 Sax No End (SABA, 1967)
 17 Men and Their Music (Campi, 1967)
 Jazz Convention Volume 1 (KPM Music, 1968)
 Jazz Convention Volume II (KPM Music, 1968)
 Jazz Convention Volume III (KPM Music, 1968)
 Live at Ronnie’s Album 1: Volcano (Rearward/Schema, 1969)
 Live at Ronnie’s Album 2: Rue Chaptal (Rearward/Schema, 1969)
 All Blues (MPS, 1969)
 All Smiles (MPS, 1969)
 More Smiles (MPS, 1969)
 Latin Kaleidoscope (MPS, 1969)
 More (Campi, 1969)
 Faces (MPS, 1969)
 Fellini 712 (MPS, 1969)
 At Her Majesty’s Pleasure (Black Lion, 1969)
 Off Limits (Polydor, 1971)
 Change of Scenes with Stan Getz (Verve, 1971)
 The Second Greatest Jazz Big Band in the World (Black Lion, 1971)
 November Girl with Carmen McRae (Black Lion, 1975) 
 Clarke Boland Big Band en Concert avec Europe 1 (Tréma, 1992)

Video
 Live in Prague 1967 (DVD) ( mpro Jazz, 2008)

References

Sources
 Clarke-Boland Big Band discography at [ allmusic.com]
 Clarke-Boland Big Band discography by Douglas Payne
 Clarke-Boland Big Band discography by David H. Taylor
 Kenny Clarke discography at [ allmusic.com]
 Fats Sadi discography at antiek.telenet.be
 Prestige discography at www.plosin.com
 SABA/MPS discography at discog.piezoelektric.org

External links
 The Kenny Clarke/Francy Boland Big Band: Where it all began (Report from Tony Brown in 1968, www.jazzprofessional.com )
 Photo of CBBB (www.jazzprofessional.com)
 Discography at jazzinbelgium.com

1960 establishments in France
1980 disestablishments in France
Modern big bands
Musical groups established in 1960
Musical groups disestablished in 1980